Pietro Balestra may refer to:
Pietro Balestra (sculptor) ( 1672 – after 1729), Italian sculptor
Pietro Balestra (economist) (1935–2005), Swiss economist